Ireland competed at the 2022 World Aquatics Championships in Budapest, Hungary from 17 June to 3 July.

Ireland named a team of four athletes, consisting of two swimmers and two divers.

Diving

Ireland entered 2 divers.

Women

Swimming

Ireland entered 2 swimmers.

Men

References

World Aquatics Championships
2022
Nations at the 2022 World Aquatics Championships